Ashley Gowers (born 12 December 1994) is an English cricketer. He is a right-handed wicket-keeper-batsman. He made his first-class debut for Leeds/Bradford MCCU against Warwickshire on 31 March 2016. Prior to his first-class debut, Gowers played local cricket in the Lancashire League.

References

External links

1994 births
Living people
Cricketers from Bury, Greater Manchester
English cricketers
Leeds/Bradford MCCU cricketers